Events in the year 2012 in Kerala

Incumbents 
Governors of Kerala - M. O. H. Farook (till Jan 26), H. R. Bhardwaj (from Jan 26 as additional charge)

Chief Minister of Kerala - Oommen Chandy

Events 

 February 15 - Enrica Lexie case - Italian mariners kills two Indian fishermen.
 May 4 - T. P. Chandrasekharan a former member of CPI (M) brutally hacked to death by assailants linked with CPI (M) by inflicting 51 fatal wounds.
 September 12 - Three day long global investment meet Emerging Kerala 2012 held at Kochi.
 November 1 - Thunchath Ezhuthachan Malayalam University established at Tirur.
 December 12 - First edition of Kochi-Muziris Biennale commenced.

Deaths 

 January 24 - Sukumar Azhikode, 85, writer and social critic.
 September 24 - Thilakan, 77, actor.

See also 

 History of Kerala
 2012 in India

References 

2010s in Kerala